Les Aventures d'Anthony is a 2015 Chinese coming-of-age romantic drama film directed by Janet Chun, produced by	Zhou Xun and based on a novel. It was released on November 13, 2015.

Cast
Liu Chang as Anthony / Andongni
Vivian Sung as Xiaohei
Bruce Hung as Pierre
Bai Baihe as Xiao Ying
Tang Yixin as Xiao Xuan
Congo Pax as Jia Ming
Jin Shijia as Fang Jie
Jiang Yiyan as Young Mrs. Huang / Nianqing Huang Taitai
Archie Kao as Young Mr. Huang / Nianqing Huang Xiansheng
Pan Hong as Anthony's Mother
Yu Rongguang as Anthony's Father
Lisa Lu as Mrs. Huang / Huang Taitai

Reception
The film grossed  on its opening weekend.

References

External links

2015 romantic drama films
Beijing Enlight Pictures films
Chinese coming-of-age films
Chinese romantic drama films
Films based on Chinese novels
2010s Mandarin-language films